Georgy Girl is a 1966 British film based on a novel by Margaret Forster.

Georgy Girl or Georgie Girl may also refer to:

"Georgy Girl" (song), the title song from the 1966 film, performed by The Seekers
Georgy Girl, a 1965 novel by Margaret Forster
Georgy Girl (musical), a 2015 jukebox musical about The Seekers
Georgie Girl, a 2001 New Zealand film directed by Annie Goldson and Peter Wells

See also
Georgy (musical), a 1970 Broadway show based on the novel and film Georgy Girl